LiveMixtapes is a music website related to hip hop mixtapes.

History 
LiveMixtapes was established in 2006. The website started from getting free mixtapes in CD form and then putting them online. After collaborating with DJs the website grew to the #1 platform to release mixtapes in the hip hop world with notable releases with artists like Future, Migos, 2 Chainz, Lil Wayne, Rick Ross, T.I. and more.

References

External links 
Official website

American music websites
Internet properties established in 2006